The Internal Russian passport (officially in  Pasport grazhdanina Rossiyskoy Federatsii, "Passport (for) Citizen of the Russian Federation", commonly referred to as  vnutrenniy pasport, "internal passport", or  obshchegrazhdanskiy pasport, "general passport") is a mandatory identity document for all Russian citizens residing in Russia who are aged 14 or over. The Internal Russian passport is an internal passport used for travel and identification purposes within the vast territory of the Russian Federation, which is distinct from the International Russian passport used by Russian citizens to travel in and out of Russian borders.

After the dissolution of the Soviet Union in 1991, the Soviet Union internal passport continued to be issued until 1997, when a new regulating decree was adopted by the government and when it was replaced by the Russian internal passport. The current Russian internal passports were first issued in 2007.

The Russian government is planning to replace the Internal Passport with a biometric, credit card size card. The Universal electronic card issued between 2013 and 2016 was planned to replace the Russian Internal passport as the sole national identity document for Russian citizens but was scrapped in early 2017.

History

Background
In Russian Empire after the liberation of the serfs in 1861 the peasant was declared by the law as attached to the former tax-paying estate or having a rural station (sel’skoe sostoianie). Membership in the peasant community, the legally mandatory reception of allotment land, arrears and collective responsibility characterized this rural station, and the passport system and residence permit enforced it. The internal passport was issued only in the local district office and was valid for the entire empire while the identification card was valid only within 30 Verst (approximately thirty kilometers) of the place of registration - thus internal passports were critical for obtaining work outside a farmer's own district.

Modern time
In 1992, passports – or other photo identification documents – became necessary to board a train. Train tickets started to bear passenger names, allegedly, as an effort to combat speculative reselling of the tickets.

On 9 December 1992, special pages were introduced which were affixed in Soviet passports, certifying that the bearer of the passport was a citizen of Russia. These pages were optional unless travelling to the other former Soviet republics which continued to accept Soviet passports; for other occasions, other proofs of citizenship were accepted as well. Issuance of the pages continued until the end of 2002.

On 8 July 1997, the currently-used design of the Russian internal passport was introduced. Unlike the Soviet passports, which had three photo pages, the new passports only have one. A passport is first issued at the age of 14, and then replaced upon reaching the ages of 20 and 45. The text in the passports is in Russian, but passports issued in autonomous entities may, on the bearer's request, contain an additional page duplicating all data in one of the official local languages.

A deadline for exchanging old passports for the new ones was initially set at year-end of 2001, but then extended several times and finally set at 30 June 2004. The government had first regulated that having failed to exchange one's passport would constitute a punishable violation. However, the Supreme Court ruled to the effect that citizens cannot be obliged to exchange their passports. The Soviet passports ceased to be valid as means of personal identification since mid-2004, but it is still legal (though barely practical) to have one.

The propiska was formally abandoned soon after adoption of the current Constitution in 1993, and replaced with "residency registration" which, in principle, was simply record of one's place of residence.

Nevertheless, under the new regulations, permanent registration records are stamped in citizens' internal passports just as were propiskas. This has led to the widespread misconception that registration was just a new name for the propiska; in fact, many still continue to call it "propiska". This misconception is partly reinforced by the fact that the existing regulations for registration make it an onerous process, being dependent on the will and consent of landlords and which effectively prevents tenants from registering themselves.

Internal Russian passports are issued only inside the country. Russian citizens who live abroad can get internal passport only if they visit Russia, i.e., it is not possible to get internal passport in the Russian consulate abroad. In practice, Russian citizens who live abroad often do not get new internal passports at all, as the law allows them to prove their identity with an international Russian passport (travel document).

Description

Each passport has a data page and a signature page. A data page has a visual zone which contains a photograph of the passport holder, data about the passport, and data about the holder:
 Surname
 Given name and patronymic
 Sex
 Date of birth
 Place of birth

Special records shall be made in the passport:
 on the registration of a citizen within a community/at a specific address and on removal from the registration records;
 on the military conscription of citizens who have by the time is 18 years old;
 on the registration and termination of a marriage;
 for children under 14 years of age;
 for any previously issued basic identity documents of a citizen of the Russian Federation on the territory of the Russian Federation;
 for the extradition of the main documents of identity of the citizen of the Russian Federation outside the Russian Federation – only about valid ones at the time mention is made.

At the citizen's request, the passport may also include:
 the holder's blood type and the Rh factor (added by the medical facility where the citizen's blood type and Rh were tested, for example after a blood transfusion or donation);
 the holder's tax identification number.

Replacement 
Renewal of the Passport is regulated by a decree №828 of 1997–2018 issued by the government which was signed by V. Chernomyrdin. According to the decree passports are due to be issued and replaced when the owner reaches certain age: at 14, 20, and 45 years old.

Upon reaching age of 20 and 45, the passport must be replaced within 30 days after date of birth. While undergoing military conscription, the passport can be issued or replaced at their place of residence at the end of the set period of military service. If a citizen is imprisoned, administration of a penal entity should return passport or render obtainment of a new one upon completion of punishment.

Issuance, replacement and usage of passports

Authorities responsible for the issuance and replacement of passports 
Passports are issued and replaced by territorial offices of the federal executive agency authorized to exercise powers in the area of migration - the place of residence of citizens, by place of stay or - the place of application. If there are agreements concluded with the territorial authorities of the Federal Migration Service, the documents for replacement/issuance of the passport of a citizen of the Russian Federation can be accepted by the Multifunctional Centres.

Previously, the issuance and replacement of passports was the responsibility of the Passport and Visa Service of the Ministry of Internal Affairs of Russia. Following Presidential Decree No. 928 of July 19, 2004, the Passport and Visa Service was dissolved and the functions of control over migration and the issuing of passports were transferred to the Federal Migration Service. The final transfer took place on 1 January 2006, after the establishment of the territorial authorities of the FMS of Russia.

On 5 April 2016, by presidential decree, the Federal Migration Service was abolished and its functions and powers were transferred to the Main Directorate for Migration Issues of the Ministry of Internal Affairs of the Russian Federation. Thus, currently, the issuance and replacement of passports are carried out by the territorial bodies of the Ministry of Internal Affairs of the Russian Federation at the place of residence, stay or application of citizens.

Rules for the use of a passport 
A citizen is obliged to keep his passport with care. A citizen must immediately report the loss of a passport to a territorial body of the Ministry of Internal Affairs.

It is forbidden to confiscate a citizen's passport, except in cases provided for by the legislation of the Russian Federation.

Until a new passport is issued, a temporary identity document, the form of which is established by the Ministry of Internal Affairs of the Russian Federation, is provided at the citizen's request by a structural subdivision of the authority competent in the area of migration.

Persons whose citizenship of the Russian Federation has been terminated must surrender their passports to the internal affairs bodies at their place of residence or place of stay, or to the territorial bodies of the Ministry of Internal Affairs. Persons residing outside the Russian Federation - to a diplomatic mission or consular office of the Russian Federation in the state of residence, which forwards them to the territorial authorities of the Ministry of Internal Affairs of Russia at the last place of residence or stay of these persons in the territory of the Russian Federation.

The found passport is to be handed over to the authorities of the Ministry of Internal Affairs.

The passport of a person remanded in custody or sentenced to imprisonment is temporarily confiscated by the pretrial investigation agency or the court and added to the personal file of the person in question. On release from custody or when serving a sentence of deprivation of liberty, the passport is returned to the citizen.

The passport of a deceased citizen is handed over to the civil registry authorities at the place of registration of the death, which send it to the territorial office of the Ministry of Internal Affairs of Russia at the last place of residence or place of stay of the deceased citizen on the territory of the Russian Federation. The passport of a citizen who died outside the Russian Federation is taken to a diplomatic mission or consular office of the Russian Federation for its subsequent forwarding to the relevant territorial body of the Ministry of Internal Affairs of Russia.

Replacement with identity cards

In November 2010, the Ministry of Internal Affairs announced the cancellation of internal passports with the aim of replacing them with plastic identity cards or driver's licenses by 2025. Country-wide replacement was postponed until 15 March 2018 not to interfere with 2016 Duma election and then until 2022.

See also

References

Public administration
Law enforcement in Russia
Government of Russia
Russia